The Nine Garrisons, Jiubian (九边, jiubian), or Jiuzhen (九镇, jiuzhen), were Chinese military garrisons along the Great Wall installed by the Ming dynasty during the reign of the 
Hongzhi Emperor between 1487 and 1505.

List of garrisons
Garrison of Liaodong (辽东镇, Liaodong zhen)
Garrison of Ji (蓟镇, Ji zhen ), or Garrison of Jizhou (蓟州镇, Jizhou zhen)
Garrison of Xuanfu (宣府镇, Xuanfu zhen) 
Garrison of Datong (大同镇, Datong zhen) 
Garrison of Taiyuan (太原镇, Taiyuan zhen), Garrison of Shanxi (山西镇, Shanxi zhen), or  Garrison of Sanguan (三关镇, Sanguan zhen)
Garrison of Yansui (延绥镇, Yansui zhen), or Garrison of Yulin (榆林镇, Yulin zhen)
Garrison of Ningxia (宁夏镇, Ningxia zhen)
Garrison of Guyuan (固原镇, Guyuan zhen), or Garrison of Shaanxi (陕西镇, Shaanxi zhen)
Garrison of Gansu (甘肃镇, Gansu zhen)

See also
Chinese military history

External links
 Cheng Dalin: The Great Wall of China: The Ming Dynasty's Military System.
 长城的防务 (Die Verteidigung der Großen Mauer, chinesisch)
 History of the Great Wall - Ming Dynasty - eleven garrisons
 The Great Wall Garrisons
Die große Mauer: Militärische Organisation und das Funktionieren der großen Mauer. Chinaweb

Military history of the Ming dynasty
Military units and formations of the Ming Dynasty